Qatar Open may refer to the following sports events:
ATP Qatar Open, a men's tennis tournament
WTA Qatar Open, a women's tennis tournament
Qatar Open (table tennis), an ITTF table tennis tournament
Qatar Ladies Open (golf), a golf event on the Ladies European Tour